Maria Treben  Günzel (27 September 1907, in Žatec, Bohemia – 26 July 1991, in Grieskirchen, Austria) was an Austrian writer and herbalist who came to fame in the 1980s for her books.

Early life
Treben was born in 1907 in Žatec, Bohemia, then Austria-Hungary, the middle of three daughters of the owner of a printing shop who died when she was 10. After the Great War, the Sudetenland became part of the newly founded Czechoslovakia. In 1945, at the end of the Second World War, she and her husband Ernst Gottfried Treben were victims of the Expulsion of Germans from Czechoslovakia. For several years they lived in refugee camps until they found refuge in Austria and settled down in Grieskirchen in 1951. She died in 1991.

Career
Treben became famous through her two books: Health Through God's Pharmacy and Maria Treben's Cures. The first was translated into 24 languages and sold over 8 million copies.

Treben addressed seminars and presented at natural health conferences in Germany, Austria and across Europe, attracting hundreds of people. She is perceived as a pioneer of the renewed interest for natural remedies and traditional medicine at the end of the 20th century.

Remedies
Treben used traditional German and Eastern European remedies handed down from previous generations. She only used local herbs and always accompanied her remedies with advice on diet. She commonly used Thyme, Greater Celandine, Ramsons, Speedwell, Calamus, Camomile, Nettle and Lady's Mantle. She treated a broad range of conditions from psoriasis to constipation and diabetes to insomnia. She used her own recipes as well as traditional healing remedies like Swedish bitters that she used as a cure-all. Some of her remedies and advice proved to be controversial, such as some of the more esoteric ingredients used in the greater swedish bitters recipe [which?]. To this day she is widely read and referred to for her knowledge of European medicinal herbs.

Death
Maria Treben died in 1991.

Works 
 Maria Treben: Gesundheit aus der Apotheke Gottes - Ratschläge und Erfahrungen mit Heilkräutern, Verlag Wilhelm Ennsthaler, Steyr, 1980, 
 Maria Treben: Maria Treben's Heilerfolge - Briefe und Berichte von Heilerfolgen, Verlag Wilhelm Ennsthaler, Steyr, 1980, 
 Maria Treben: Allergien - vorbeugen - erkennen - heilen / Gesund mit Maria Treben, Ennsthaler (auch bei Heyne, München)
 Maria Treben: Streß im Alltag. Vorbeugen, erkennen, heilen. München: Heyne, 1990,

References

External links 
 Article in The Canadian Journal of Health & Nutrition. MARIA TREBEN: A Pioneer of Herbal Healing
 Article in HerbalGram. The Life of Maria Treben
 Online reference of herbs recommended by Maria Treben to treat various conditions
 Health Through God's Pharmacy by Maria Treben. 
 Maria Treben's Cures: Letters and Accounts of Cures Through the Herbal "Health Through God's Pharmacy". 
 Review of "Health Through God's Pharmacy" 

1907 births
1991 deaths
People from Žatec
German Bohemian people
Herbalists
Austrian women writers
20th-century German women writers
20th-century Austrian writers